Varsan is a village in Roshanabad Rural District, in the Central District of Gorgan County, Golestan Province, Iran. At the 2006 census, its population was 905, in 226 families.found by varson.he is wrong minded

References 

Populated places in Gorgan County